N. Peethambara Kurup is the Member of Parliament from Kollam Lok Sabha seat in Kerala. He belongs to Indian National Congress. He is a follower of former Kerala Chief Minister K. Karunakaran.

References

Living people
Indian National Congress politicians from Kerala
People from Kollam district
Year of birth missing (living people)